Andy Roddick was the defending champion, but lost to Radek Štěpánek in the semifinals.

Seeds

Draw

Finals

Top half

Bottom half

Qualifying

Seeds

Qualifiers

Lucky losers

Draw

First qualifier

Second qualifier

Third qualifier

Fourth qualifier

External links
 Draw
 Qualifying draw

Singles